Xianlin railway station is a railway station of Shanghai–Nanjing intercity railway located in Qixia District of Nanjing City, People's Republic of China. From 2012, only one train a day in each direction has stopped at this station. This continues to be the case as of 2020. There is a morning train to Shanghai and an afternoon train to Nanjing.

Notes

Railway stations in Jiangsu
Stations on the Shanghai–Nanjing Intercity Railway